Gáspár Csere (born 12 August 1991) is a Hungarian long distance runner who specialises in the marathon. He competed in the men's marathon event at the 2016 Summer Olympics. In 2018, he competed in the men's marathon at the 2018 European Athletics Championships held in Berlin, Germany. He finished in 29th place.

References

External links
 
 
 
 
 

1991 births
Living people
Hungarian male long-distance runners
Hungarian male marathon runners
Place of birth missing (living people)
Athletes (track and field) at the 2016 Summer Olympics
Olympic athletes of Hungary
21st-century Hungarian people